The State University Santa Elena Peninsula (Spanish: Universidad Estatal Península de Santa Elena, - literal translation: State University Santa Elena Peninsula, UPSE), is a public university located in the canton freedom of the province of Santa Elena in the Republic of Ecuador, is the first autonomous center of teaching and which has the largest student population in the area.

Currently the UPSE is accredited in the System of Higher Education, ranking in category C, according to the assessment made by the Board of Evaluation, Accreditation and Quality Assurance in Higher Education (CEAACES)

History 

From 1984 to 1994 the municipalities of Salinas and Santa Elena and various civic institutions took steps in an attempt to institutionalize Higher Education in the Santa Elena Peninsula, achieving the operation of the University Extension University of Guayaquil in the areas Industrial Engineering with Industrial Technology Program; Arts, Business Administration and Languages.

On November 6, 1997 was again presented the Project, It is approved by the National Congress on 1 and 2 July 1998, with some reforms such as decreased academic faculties, participation of the University of Guayaquil in the initial organization of the University created and the highlight the name change in the original project consisted University of the Pacific in Santa Elena Peninsula, the State University Santa Elena Peninsula.
Finally on July 17, 1998, Dr. Fabián Alarcón Interim President of the Republic of Ecuador signed the execute Law No. 110, and that
promulgated in the Official Gazette Supplement # 366 of July 22, 1998.

List of schools 

 School of Administrative Sciences
 School of Agricultural Sciences
 School of Science Education and Languages
 School of Engineering Sciences
 School of Marine Sciences
 School of Social Sciences and Health
 School of Systems and Telecommunications
 School of Industrial engineer

Masters
 Masters in Business Administration Mention Management of SMEs
 Master of Human Resource Management
 Masters in Sustainable Tourism Management Mention in Tourist Destinations

Institute for Scientific Research and Technological Development 
The Institute for Scientific Research and Technological Development, UPSE, established by Resolution No. 005 of the H. University Council at its meeting on June 7, 2006, is a company  which drives scientific and technological development in the province. This institute is involved in aplicciones management and magazine publishing, management of virtual training and institutional mail.

Research centers
 Center for Environmental comprehensive studies
 Center for Agricultural Research
 Biological Research Center
 Geoscience Research Center

Megatherium Paleontology Museum

A small museum presenting South American megafauna fossil remains is located on the university campus.

See also

List of universities in Ecuador

References

External links
 /www.upse.edu.ec/ Portal oficial de la universidad.
 /www.fca.upse.edu.ec/.
 /www.facsistel.upse.edu.ec/.
 /www.faccei.upse.edu.ec/.
 /www.facsociales.upse.edu.ec/.
 /www.facindustrial.upse.edu.ec/.
 /www.facingen.upse.edu.ec/.
 /www.facagrarias.upse.edu.ec/.
 /upse.edu.ec/cigeo.
 /www.upse.edu.ec/museo.

Universities in Ecuador